Arvydas Bagdžius  (23 November 1958, in Vilnius, Lithuania – 2 June 2008) was a Lithuanian painter.

See also
List of Lithuanian painters

References
This article was initially translated from the Lithuanian Wikipedia.

1958 births
2008 deaths
Artists from Vilnius
20th-century Lithuanian painters